The Marathi people of Maharashtra in India have contributed to a diverse range of fields, including the sciences, arts, politics, literatures and Sports.

 List of Maratha dynasties and states
 List of Marathi people in sports
 List of Marathi social reformers
 List of Marathi people in literature and journalism
 List of Marathi people in science, engineering and technology
 List of Marathi people in the performing arts
 List of Marathi Buddhists

 
Lists
People